Claude Eugene Floquet (3 November 1884 – 22 November 1963) was an occasional player for Transvaal from 1905 to 1910. He played a Test match for South Africa in 1910.

His first-class career of just six matches was spread over six seasons between 1904–05 and 1910–11.  He batted right-handed in the middle to lower part of the order and bowled medium pace occasionally.  He appeared in the Third Test of the series against England on their tour of 1909-10, which was played at the Old Wanderers Ground in Johannesburg, as were all Floquet's first-class matches. He scored 1 and 11 not out and took 0 for 24 with the ball.

His older brother Bertram also played for Transvaal.

References

External links
 
 

1884 births
1963 deaths
People from Aliwal North
South Africa Test cricketers
South African cricketers
Gauteng cricketers
Cricketers from the Eastern Cape